Michaël Johan Stefan (Mike) Verstraeten (born 12 August 1967 in Mechelen, Belgium) is a Belgian politician and a former football player.  His former clubs include Germinal Ekeren and R.S.C. Anderlecht.  Capped for the Belgium national team, Verstraeten played one game at the 1998 FIFA World Cup.

Honours
Germinal Ekeren
 Belgian Cup: 1996–97

References

Mike Verstraeten career statistics at the Belgian Soccer Database 

1967 births
Living people
Belgian footballers
Belgium international footballers
Beerschot A.C. players
R.S.C. Anderlecht players
1998 FIFA World Cup players
Belgian Pro League players
Politicians from Mechelen
Sportspeople from Mechelen
Footballers from Antwerp Province
Association football defenders